The Last Train is a 2006 German film directed by Joseph Vilsmaier and Dana Vávrová, and starring Gedeon Burkhard, Lale Yavas, and Lena Beyerling.

The film depicts the fate of some of the last remaining Jews in Berlin, who in April 1943 were rounded up at the Berlin-Grunewald station and sent to the Nazi concentration camp at Auschwitz. The film stands out due to its proximity as well as the unsparing realism with which the brutality of a transport to the Auschwitz concentration camp appears.

Casting 
Gedeon Burkhard, Henry Neumann
Lale Yavas, Lea Neumann
Lena Beyerling, Nina Neumann
Sibel Kekilli, Ruth Zilbermann
Roman Roth, Albert Rosen
Brigitee Grothum, Gabrielle Hellman
Hans-Jürgen Silbermann, Jakob Noschik
Sharon Brauner, Erika Friedlich
Juraj Kukura, Dr. Friedlich
Ludwig Blochberger, Crewes

Background
Der letze Zug was filmed in Germany and Czech Republic and went into production in May 2005 on a budget of €2.7 million. During filming, director Joseph Vilsmaier fell from a crane and suffered permanent, albeit minor, injuries. Production halted for two weeks while he was hospitalized. Filming resumed once Vilsmaier recovered, but his wife, actress Dana Vávrová took over directing duties while Vilsmaier supervised.

The film premiered on May 20, 2006 at the 40th Hof International Film Festival. It was widely released in theaters in Germany by The Central Cinema Company on November 9, 2006, the 68th anniversary of Kristallnacht.

Reception
Eddie Cockrell of Variety stated it had "erratic production values and one-dimensional characterizations" and it is "destined for specialty fests and undiscerning cablers, with solid ancillary classroom use".

References

External links  
 Website at Concorde-Film
 
 

2006 films
Czech drama films
Films directed by Joseph Vilsmaier
2000s German-language films
Films shot in Cologne
Films shot in Berlin
Films about Jews and Judaism
Films about Nazi Germany
Films set in Germany
Holocaust films
German prison films
2000s German films